Michael Riley "Doc" Powers (September 22, 1870 – April 26, 1909) was an American Major League Baseball player who caught for four teams from  to . 

He played for the Louisville Colonels and Washington Senators of the National League, and the Philadelphia Athletics and New York Highlanders of the American League. 

He played college baseball at College of the Holy Cross and at the University of Notre Dame in 1897 and 1898. 

His nickname was derived honestly from the fact he was a licensed physician as well as a ballplayer. During a brief stint with the New York Highlanders in 1905, Powers caught while Jim "Doc" Newton pitched, creating the only known example of a two-physician battery in Major League history.

On April 12, 1909, Powers was injured during the first game played in Philadelphia's Shibe Park, crashing into a wall while chasing a foul pop-up. He sustained internal injuries from the collision and died two weeks later from complications from three intestinal surgeries, becoming possibly the first Major Leaguer to suffer an on-field injury that eventually led to his death. The immediate cause of death was peritonitis arising from post-surgery infections.

Powers left behind his wife, Florence W. Ehrmann; and three daughters. 

He was buried in St. Louis Catholic Cemetery in Louisville, Kentucky.

See also
 List of baseball players who died during their careers

References

External links

1870 births
1909 deaths
Sportspeople from Pittsfield, Massachusetts
Major League Baseball catchers
Baseball players from Massachusetts
Philadelphia Athletics players
New York Highlanders players
Holy Cross Crusaders baseball players
Louisville Colonels players
Washington Senators (1891–1899) players
Notre Dame Fighting Irish baseball players
Sports deaths in Pennsylvania
London (minor league baseball) players
Galt (minor league baseball) players
Petersburg Farmers players
Hampton Clamdiggers players
Deaths from peritonitis
Burials at St. Louis Cemetery, Louisville
19th-century baseball players